Parliamentary elections were held in Bulgaria on 4 September 1911. The result was a victory for the People's Party–Progressive Liberal Party alliance, which won 190 of the 213 seats. Voter turnout was 47.2%.

Results

References

Bulgaria
1911 in Bulgaria
Parliamentary elections in Bulgaria
September 1911 events
1911 elections in Bulgaria